Alioum is both a surname and a given name. Notable people with the name include:

Sidi Alioum (born 1982), Cameroonian football referee
Alioum Boukar (born 1972), Cameroonian footballer
Alioum Moussa (born 1977), Cameroonian graphic designer and illustrator
Alioum Saidou (born 1978), Cameroonian footballer
Saidou Alioum (born 2003), Cameroonian footballer